is a Japanese horror manga series by Madoka Kawaguchi. It was adapted into a television series that premiered on 21 September 2012 in Japan.

Characters
Yukari Tokino (Azusa Mine)
Yūsaku Matsumi (Tomohiro Ichikawa)
Natsumi (Atsuko Sakurai)

References

External links
Official TV series website 

Japanese television dramas based on manga
2012 Japanese television series debuts
1991 manga
Kodansha manga
Josei manga
Horror anime and manga
Japanese horror fiction television series